Yoko Moriwaki (森脇 瑤子, Moriwaki Yōko; June 1932 – 6 August 1945) was a thirteen-year-old Japanese girl who lived in Hiroshima during World War II. Her diary, a record of wartime Japan before the bombing of Hiroshima, was published in Japan in 1996. It was published by HarperCollins in English in 2013 as Yoko's Diary.

She lived in Hiroshima during World War II and died during the atomic bombing of the city by the United States. Her brother, Koji Hosokawa, who survived the attack on Hiroshima, made her diary available for publication.

Moriwaki started keeping her diary as an assignment at her school, the Hiroshima Prefectural Girls' HS #1. In addition to chronicling her daily life, it kept a record of wartime Japan, covering topics from what classes she was taking to sightings of war planes flying overhead. The diary starts on 6 April 1945, shortly before she started school, and the last entry is from 5 August 1945, the day before the atomic bomb was dropped on Hiroshima.

Moriwaki has been compared to World War II diarist Anne Frank, known for her own record of being Jewish in the Netherlands during World War II. Like Moriwaki, Frank died during the course of World War II.

References

1932 births
1945 deaths
Writers from Hiroshima
Atomic bombings of Hiroshima and Nagasaki
Hibakusha
Women diarists
Japanese civilians killed in World War II
20th-century Japanese women writers
Deaths by airstrike during World War II
20th-century diarists
Japanese children

Child deaths